The 1984 Duke Blue Devils football team represented the Duke Blue Devils of Duke University during the 1984 NCAA Division I-A football season.

Schedule

A.Clemson was under NCAA probation, and was ineligible for the ACC title. Therefore this game did not count in the league standings.

References

Duke
Duke Blue Devils football seasons
Duke Blue Devils football